1991–92 Eccellenza Friuli-Venezia Giulia was the 6th level of Italian football, and it was the highest one in this region.

This is the 1st season of Eccellenza, 16 clubs took part in:
 12 clubs come from Promozione Friuli-Venezia Giulia 1990–91
 2 clubs were relegated from Interregionale 1990–91
 2 clubs were promoted from Prima Categoria Friuli-Venezia Giulia 1990–91.

Teams

Final table

 : Domestic cup winners

Relegation tie-breake
Played in Ronchi dei Legionari on May 10, 1992.

|}

See also
Eccellenza Friuli-Venezia Giulia

References

External links
www.calciofvg.it

Sport in Friuli-Venezia Giulia
6
Eccellenza Friuli-Venezia Giulia